The Accommodations of Desire is a 1929 surrealist oil painting and mixed media collage on board by Spanish artist Salvador Dalí.  It is now in the Metropolitan Museum of Art in New York City.

History
Dalí was inspired to create the piece after a walk with his future wife Gala Dalí, who was at the time married to fellow surrealist Paul Éluard, with whom Dalí was having an affair. The painting purportedly represents Dalí's anxiety over the situation, and what the future would hold for him.  The painting also mythologizes Dali's relationship with his father. 

The painted work consists primarily of seven large pebbles, each with a different symbol that Dalí believed would come to pass as a result of the affair. 

The piece uses pasted-on cutouts from a children's book, whose visual style bears a striking resemblance to the aesthetic of the painting itself.

References

External links
 
 

Paintings by Salvador Dalí
1929 paintings
Surrealist paintings
Paintings in the collection of the Metropolitan Museum of Art
Lions in art